Nikolay Anatoliyevich Kulpin (12 December 1968 – 12 March 2003) was a Kazakhstani boxer. He competed in the men's super heavyweight event at the 1992 Summer Olympics representing the Unified Team.

Amateur career
 TSC Tournament (+91 kg), Berlin, East Germany, July 1988:
1/2: Lost to Jorge Luis González (Cuba) by unanimous decision, 0–5
 Canada Cup (+91 kg), Civic Centre, Ottawa, Canada, June 1991:
1/4: Defeated Vernon Linklater (Canada) KO 1 
1/2: Defeated Paul Douglas (Ireland) KO 1 
Finals: Defeated Andrey Aulov (RSFSR) RSCO 3 
 X Summer Spartakiad of Peoples of the USSR, boxing (+91 kg), Minsk, Belarus SSR, July 1991:
1/2: Defeated Mikhail Yurchenko (Kazakh SSR)
Finals: Defeated Oleg Maskaev (Uzbek SSR)
USA−USSR Middle & Heavy Duals (+91 kg), Camp Lejeune, North Carolina, December 1991:
Defeated Archie Perry (United States) RSC 1 
 CIS Boxing Championships (+91 kg), Tambov, Russia, February 1992:
1/2: Defeated Andrey Aulov (Russia)
Finals: Lost to Mikhail Yurchenko (Kazakhstan)
 King's Cup (+91 kg), Bangkok, Thailand, April 1992:
Finals: Defeated Jung-hyun An (South Korea) RSC
 Seoul Cup (+91 kg), Seoul, South Korea, May 1992:
1/2: Defeated Ahmed Sarir (Morocco) RSC 1
Finals: Defeated Jeong Seung-won (South Korea)
Olympic Games (+91 kg), Barcelona, Spain, July 1992:
1/8: Lost to Larry Donald (United States) RSCI 3 
World Championships (+91 kg), Tampere, Finland, May 1993:
1/8: Defeated Piotr Jurczyk (Poland) on points, 16–4
1/4: Lost to Yevgeniy Belousov (Russia) on points, 8–10
After two professional fights in 1992 Kulpin resumed his amateur career to compete in the 1993 World Championships, where he was dropped out from the quarterfinals.

Professional boxing record

References

External links
 

Nikolay Kulpin Amateur Record at the BoxingRecords. Last updated : April 12, 2006.

1968 births
2003 deaths
Kazakhstani male boxers
Olympic boxers of the Unified Team
Boxers at the 1992 Summer Olympics
People from Pavlodar
Super-heavyweight boxers